The Wyssegga is a mountain of the Swiss Pennine Alps, between the Turtmanntal and the Mattertal in the canton of Valais.

The closest locality is Gruben/Meiden on the west side.

References

External links
 Wyssegga on Hikr

Mountains of the Alps
Alpine three-thousanders
Mountains of Valais
Mountains of Switzerland